The 2011 Campeonato Paranaense de Futebol Profissional da 1ª Divisão is the 96th season of Paraná's top professional football league. The competition began on January 16 and will end on May 15. Coritiba is the defending champion.

Format
The tournament consists of a double round-robin format, in which all twelve teams play each other twice, with classification split in two stages. The first stage of the tournament started on January 16 and will end on February 27 and the second stage will start on March 5 and end on May 1. The better-placed teams of each stage will face themselves in a two-legged tie, with the team with the most points in the overall classification playing the second leg home, the winning team will then be declared champion. The finals are notable in the sense that goal difference will not be a tiebreaking criteria, if both teams tie on points the decision will go directly to a penalty shootout. If the same team is best-placed on both stages, it will automatically be declared champion.

The best two-placed teams in the overall classification not advancing to the finals and not from Curitiba will face themselves in a two-legged tie competing for the Torneio do Interior. The team with the most points will play the second leg home. The bottom two teams on overall classification will be relegated.

Qualifications 
The best three teams not qualified to 2012 Copa Libertadores will qualify for 2012 Copa do Brasil. The best two teams not playing in Campeonato Brasileiro Série A, B or C will qualify for 2011 Campeonato Brasileiro Série D.

Participating teams

First stage

Second stage

Notable matches 
Round 21: Atlético Paranaense vs. Coritiba 

On penultimate  matchday Atlético Paranaense will play against first stage champions and second stage leader Coritiba. Coritiba won this match and became champion prematurely.

Overall classification

References

Campeonato Paranaense
Paranaense